The Prix Lionel-Boulet is an award by the Government of Quebec that is part of the Prix du Québec, which "goes to researchers who have distinguished themselves through their inventions, their scientific and technological innovations, their leadership in scientific development, and their contribution to Québec's economic growth". It is named in honour of Lionel Boulet.

Winners

Source: Les Prix du Québec

See also 

 List of general science and technology awards 
 Karim Zaghib

References

Canadian science and technology awards
Prix du Québec